The 2011 LNFA season was the 17th season of top-tier American football in Spain. The regular season began on January 22, 2011 and ended on May 14, 2011. The playoffs began on May 15 and ended on June 18. 

The tournament was about to keep its format of 15 teams divided into three conferences of five teams each, but Marbella Sharks withdrew the competition months before it started, so the teams were reassigned. The Spanish Conference included the six top teams of the 2010 season. The National and Hispanic Conferences included four teams each. At the end of the regular season, the three top finishers of the Conferencia Española accessed directly to the semi finals for the title, and faced the winner of the playoffs between wild cards.

L'Hospitalet Pioners won their fourth LNFA title, the second in a row.

Results

Regular season

Spanish Conference

National Conference

Hispanic Conference

Play-offs

See also
 LNFA

External links
AEFA American Football Spanish Association 

Liga Nacional de Fútbol Americano
2011 in American football